The Mighty is a 1929 American action film directed by John Cromwell and written by Grover Jones, Robert N. Lee, Herman J. Mankiewicz, William Slavens McNutt and Nellie Revell. The film stars George Bancroft, Esther Ralston, Warner Oland, Raymond Hatton, Dorothy Revier, Morgan Farley and O.P. Heggie. The film was released on November 16, 1929, by Paramount Pictures.

Cast 
George Bancroft as Blake Greeson
Esther Ralston as Louise Patterson
Warner Oland as Sterky
Raymond Hatton as Dogey Franks
Dorothy Revier as Mayme
Morgan Farley as Jerry Patterson
O.P. Heggie as J.K. Patterson
Charles Sellon as The Mayor
E. H. Calvert as Major General
John Cromwell as Mr. Jamieson

References

External links 
 

1929 films
American action films
1920s action films
Paramount Pictures films
Films directed by John Cromwell
American black-and-white films
1920s English-language films
1920s American films